During the afternoon of June 18, 2018, American rapper Jahseh Dwayne Ricardo Onfroy, known professionally as XXXTentacion, was murdered by 22-year old Michael Boatwright in an attempted robbery just outside RIVA Motorsports, an upscale seller of motorcycles and watercraft in Deerfield Beach, Florida. He was shot by Boatwright multiple times in the neck and was in critical condition before being pronounced dead at 5:30 p.m.

Authorities initially charged four men: Michael Boatwright, Trayvon Newsome, Dedrick Williams, and Robert Allen with first-degree murder and robbery with a firearm. On August 12, 2022, Robert Allen reached a plea deal with the prosecution in exchange for testimony against the other three defendants. Allen pleaded guilty to robbery with a firearm and to the lesser conviction of second-degree murder. His sentencing is scheduled for April 12, 2023, and he faces up to life imprisonment.

The trial for the three defendants initiated on February 7, 2023. On March 20, 2023, Boatwright, Newsome, and Williams were found guilty on all counts. They all face a presumptive sentence of life imprisonment without the possibility of parole.

Murder

On June 18, 2018, Onfroy went to Bank of America to withdraw money before heading to RIVA Motorsports, an upscale seller of motorcycles and boats in Deerfield Beach, Florida. After withdrawing money, he was followed by a dark-colored Dodge Journey SUV containing Dedrick Williams, Robert Allen, Michael Boatwright, and Trayvon Newsome.

The murder was targeted and not random. They determined Williams had been in a probation office the same time as Onfroy in January 2018, and likely recognized Onfroy's car the day of the murder. Williams spotted Onfroy's car and called the other perpetrators, saying that they should go into the dealership that Onfroy had entered to confirm that it was actually him.

At 3:30 p.m. EDT, Onfroy arrived at RIVA Motorsports and entered with his step-uncle. Security camera footage showed that Robert Allen and Dedrick Williams then followed Onfroy inside the store, and walked right past Onfroy as he was browsing motorcycles. They are recorded coming into RIVA and buying two black masks. Half an hour later, Onfroy left the dealership, entered his black BMW i8 and began to drive away from the dealership. The SUV drove in front of Onfroy's car, blocking him in while Newsome and Boatwright exited the vehicle and demanded property from Onfroy. A brief struggle ensued, in which Boatwright and Newsome punched Onfroy, and Boatwright stole Onfroy's Louis Vuitton bag and Newsome stole Onfroy's chain. Amid the struggle, Onfroy's step-uncle fled the car. Newsome ran back to the perpetrators' vehicle. Despite the robbery being over, Boatwright walked back one or two feet away from Onfroy's vehicle, grabbed his rifle, looked Onfroy in the eyes, and fired six shots, murdering him. Witnesses told police Newsome and Boatwright then took the Louis Vuitton bag from Onfroy's vehicle and then ran to the black Dodge.

The shooting occurred east of the city of Parkland where Onfroy was living at the time. The Broward County Fire Department rushed him to the nearby Broward Health North. Paramedics were able to briefly revive a pulse, but it was never regained. Onfroy was initially reported to be in critical condition following the shooting, but the Broward County Sheriff's Office later confirmed his death.

Arrests

Shortly following the announcement of Onfroy's death, the Broward County Sheriff's Office offered a $3,000 bounty for any information leading to the arrest of any suspects. Originally, many fans of Onfroy's, numerous internet users and local residents suspected local Florida rappers Soldier Kidd and Soldier Jojo to be the killers of Onfroy due to several suspicious Instagram posts made by the pair with specific details that corroborated with witness reports, but these accusations were later dropped when Dedrick Williams and Michael Boatwright were arrested.

On June 20, 2018, the Broward County Sheriff's Office arrested 22-year-old Dedrick Devonshay Williams in connection with Onfroy's murder. Williams was driving in his silver 2004 Honda before a traffic stop occurred. Williams was detained in the car chase that followed. Williams was identified by clothing he wore on June 18, which included orange sandals and a white tank top. The police matched images from security footage to recent pictures from Williams' Instagram feed, which featured "the same or similar bright orange sandals". He was also identified by employees who said they saw him enter RIVA Motorsports to buy a neoprene mask. After Williams' arrest, two more active warrants were issued.

On June 27, 22-year-old Robert Allen was named as a person of interest in the case, and was later arrested on July 26.

On July 5, 22-year-old Michael Boatwright was arrested by the Broward County Sheriff's Office on drug-related charges, but on July 10, Boatwright was visited by detectives while in jail and was presented with his arrest warrant for premeditated first-degree murder. Investigators said Boatwright had searched for "accessory to murder" and "XXXTentacion" on his phone's web browser after the murder. Police believe that Boatwright was the one who fatally shot Onfroy. The three men were later indicted by a grand jury, alongside a fourth, for Onfroy's murder. 

On August 7, 20-year-old Trayvon Newsome was arrested.

Legal proceedings
Dedrick Williams was charged with dangerous and depraved first-degree murder and probation violation, and was denied bail. On June 25, he pled not guilty. Williams had been arrested multiple times prior.

During Williams's interrogation, he reportedly went from denying he was involved in the killing to remorse, saying it had cost him "sleepless nights" and that he did not confess earlier due to fear of being labeled a "snitch".

On July 10, Michael Boatwright was arrested and charged with premeditated first-degree murder. According to the Broward County Sheriff's Office, Boatwright was initially arrested on unrelated drug charges on July 5 before he was formally charged with Onfroy's murder on July 10.

On July 25, a third suspect, Robert Allen, 22, was taken into custody and charged with premeditated first-degree murder after U.S. Marshals found him at his sister's house in rural Georgia. He was booked in Dodge County, Georgia and is being held without bond on a warrant from the Broward County Sheriff's Office.

On August 7, the Broward County Sheriff's Office announced on Twitter that Trayvon Newsome, 20, was taken into custody shortly before 5:00p.m. EST and had been booked on charges of premeditated first-degree murder and robbery with a deadly weapon.

Jahseh Onfroy's father, Dwayne Onfroy, has stated that he wants the death penalty for the suspected shooter and life imprisonment without the possibility of parole for the suspected accomplices. Since the suspects are being charged in Florida, if convicted of first-degree murder, they would have been eligible for capital punishment. However, the prosecution decided to seek life in prison without the possibility of parole over the death penalty.

On August 12, 2022, Robert Allen pleaded guilty to the lesser conviction of second-degree murder in exchange for testimony against the other three defendants.

In October 2022, Boatwright's attorneys began to claim that he is incompetent to stand trial and requested that psychological experts be appointed to determine Boatwright's legal competence. Boatwright was declared mentally competent to stand trial.

Trial

After Boatwright's attorneys requested a psychological evaluation for him before a trial, he was evaluated and ruled competent to stand trial. Trial judge Michael Usan ruled on January 17, 2023 that Onfroy's past criminal history and personal character are irrelevant to the crime and will not be permitted subjects at trial. The trial initiated on February 7, 2023. On March 20, 2023, all three defendants were found guilty on all counts. They face a presumptive sentence of life imprisonment without the possibility of parole.

Reaction

Following the announcement of Onfroy's murder, a makeshift memorial was quickly created by fans and local residents, consisting of lyrics from the artist and words of remembrance written in chalk stretching up to a hundred yards. The owner of RIVA Motorsports, where XXXTentacion was killed, held a vigil on June 18, 2018. Hundreds gathered during the vigil and Broward County Sheriffs were forced to close the street. Shortly after, a walk commenced between Onfroy's fans. Onfroy's house in Parkland, Florida, which was being built at the time, was also memorialized by fans.

Internet personality Adam Grandmaison, known professionally as Adam22, the creator of the podcast No Jumper, for which Onfroy had his first professional interview, held a memorial a day after Onfroy's death in front of his BMX retail store OnSomeShit on Melrose Avenue in Los Angeles to a crowd of 354 people. The crowd eventually grew to over 1,000 and police in riot gear eventually appeared with police en route to disperse the crowd. According to reports, rubber bullets were shot and tear gas was used to disperse the crowd.

An open casket service for Onfroy took place at BB&T Center in Sunrise, Florida, on June 27, where fans were allowed to pay their respects. His private funeral took place a day later, where rappers Lil Uzi Vert, Lil Yachty, Denzel Curry, and singer Erykah Badu were among the attendees. He was laid to rest in a gray mausoleum at the Gardens of Boca Raton Memorial Park, in Boca Raton, Florida.

On June 19, the day after Onfroy's death, Billboard reported that Taylor Swift's Spotify single-day streaming record for "Look What You Made Me Do" was broken by Onfroy's track "Sad!", with over 10.4 million streams compared to Swift's 10.1 million streams. This was followed by a 17-fold sales increase across all streaming and download platforms, including a 7000-fold sales increase in CDs on Amazon.com. Onfroy's album ? was expected to return to the top five the week of his death following his murder, ultimately reaching number three with 90,000 album-equivalent units sold, up from 19,000 the last week. In the week following his murder, Onfroy's highest-charting single, "Sad!", went from 52nd to 1st on the Billboard Hot 100, making him the first artist to top the Hot 100 posthumously in a lead role since The Notorious B.I.G., with "Mo Money Mo Problems", in 1997. On June 28, his management team posthumously released the music video for "Sad!", which has received over 155 million views whilst the audio has over 1.9 billion listens on Spotify.

Between June 18 and October 21, singer Billie Eilish and her brother Finneas, wrote a song dedicated to XXXTentacion titled "6.18.18", which was performed by Billie Eilish during their "1-by-1" tour.

See also

List of murdered hip hop musicians
Murder of Tupac Shakur

References

Notes

2018 in Florida
Crime in Florida
June 2018 crimes in the United States
Attacks in the United States in 2018
Filmed killings
Filmed deaths in the United States
Filmed deaths of entertainers
Deerfield Beach, Florida
Deaths by person in Florida
Incidents of violence against men
Violence against men in North America
Killing